Silent Voices is a 2005 docudrama about domestic violence in the United Kingdom written for the Community Channel by  Barbara Gorna "based on interviews with over 100 people affected by domestic violence in the UK," according to the British Film catalogue. The film weaves together seven stories presented as monologues by seven actors.

The film was directed by Charles Harris and produced by Paul Atherton. The music was written by Damian Coldwell.

In 2008 Silent Voices was released as a DVD. Part of the proceeds for each sale went to the charity NCDV (National Centre for Domestic Violence).

DVD Monthly called the film "an eye-opening experience." Empire Magazine gave it 3 stars of a possible 5, calling it a "stark uncompromising look at the realities of domestic violence."

See also
 Domestic Violence Documentaries

References

External links

The Big Issue – interview with Paul Atherton written by Daisy Greenwell 17–24 November 2008
Third Sector Magazine written by Hannah Jordan, Pg 2, "Charities Refuse Proceeds of DVD" 28 November 2008
Silent Voices on  The Community Channel
Silent Voices on Amazon.co.uk

Films about domestic violence
British docudrama films
2005 television films
2005 films
2000s British films